Church of St Peter is a  Grade I listed church in Harrold, Bedfordshire, England.

See also
Grade I listed buildings in Bedfordshire

References

Church of England church buildings in Bedfordshire
Grade I listed churches in Bedfordshire